Software Design and Development (SDD) is the study of designing and developing software. SDD is also a subject offered to senior high school students in Australia in university entrance exams such as the Higher School Certificate (HSC) and the Victorian Certificate of Education (VCE).

Victoria

VCE Course
In Victoria, the course in the VCE is known as Information Technology: Software Development.

New South Wales

HSC Course
In New South Wales, SDD is separated into the Preliminary (Year 11) and HSC (Year 12) courses. A prerequisite for the HSC Course is successful completion of the Preliminary Course, which is the same for any other course in the HSC. The course also often requires a major project, in which students must plan, design and develop a software application. The course in NSW is set out in the NSW Board of Studies HSC Software Design and Development syllabus document.

Preliminary Course
Concepts and Issues in the Design and Development of Software (30%)
Social and ethical issues 
Hardware and software
Software development approaches
Introduction to Software Development (50%)
Defining the problem and planning software solutions
Building software solutions
Checking software solutions
Modifying software solutions

Developing Software Solutions (20%)

Course Structure
Development and Impact of Software Solutions (15%)
Social and ethical issues 
Application of software development approaches
	
Software Development Cycle (40%)
Defining and understanding the problem
Planning and design of software solutions
Implementation of software solutions
Testing and evaluation of software solutions
Maintenance of software solutions

Developing a Solution Package (25%)

Options (20%)
One of the following options:
Programming paradigms, or
The interrelationship between hardware and software

See also
Information Processes and Technology, which is a similar course offered in the HSC.

References

External links
Board of Studies Website

Education in Australia by subject
Information technology education
Vocational education in Australia